Daily News Record (or DNR) was an American fashion trade journal published by Fairchild Publications, Inc. DNR started in 1890 when Edmund Fairchild used the wealth he had accumulated selling soap to purchase the Chicago Herald Gazette, a newspaper which focused on the men’s clothing business.  Along with his brother Luis, Fairchild published a mimeographed paper which they called the Daily Trade Record and distributed at the 1893 Chicago World's Fair.

The paper was so successful that the pair decided to continue publication even after the fair finished. It acquired its current name some time later, and included a small feature about women’s wear. In July, 1910, this feature was split from the paper, and given its own publication that is today Women's Wear Daily.

In 1999, the parent company of the Daily News Record, Fairchild Publications, Inc. was acquired by Condé Nast Publications after briefly being owned by The Walt Disney Company (which had acquired when it purchased Capital Cities Communications).

The staff was told of DNR'''s folding at an afternoon meeting on November 20, 2008, by editor in chief John Birmingham. Its men's fashion coverage was absorbed into Women's Wear Daily'' and is featured every week.

References

External links
Daily News Record online

Business magazines published in the United States
Weekly magazines published in the United States
Defunct Condé Nast magazines
Defunct magazines published in the United States
Magazines established in 1892
Men's fashion magazines
Magazines disestablished in 2008
Fashion magazines published in the United States